Blacklands is the second and final album by Music for Pleasure and was released in 1985.

Track listing

Whirlpool LP: WHLP 6

Production
 Music for Pleasure - producer  
 Rob O'Connor/Stylorouge - artwork

References

1985 albums
Music for Pleasure (band) albums